Auckland are a New Zealand professional rugby union team based in Auckland, New Zealand. The union was originally established in 1883, with the National Provincial Championship established in 1976. They now play in the reformed National Provincial Championship competition. They play their home games at Eden Park in Auckland. The team is affiliated with the Blues Super Rugby franchise. Their home playing colours are blue and white hoops.

Current squad

The Auckland squad for the 2022 Bunnings NPC is:

Honours

Auckland have been overall Champions on 17 occasions. Their first title was in 1982 and their most recent title was in 2018. Their full list of honours include:

National Provincial Championship First Division
 Winners: 1982, 1984, 1985, 1987, 1988, 1989, 1990, 1993, 1994, 1995, 1996, 1999, 2002, 2003, 2005

Air New Zealand Cup
 Winners: 2007

Mitre 10 Cup Premiership Division
 Winners: 2018

Current Super Rugby players
Players named in the 2022 Auckland squad, who also earned contracts or were named in a squad for any side participating in the 2022 Super Rugby Pacific season.

References

External links
Official site
Supporters Club

New Zealand rugby union teams
Rugby clubs established in 1976
1976 establishments in New Zealand
Sport in Auckland
Rugby union in the Auckland Region